Yan Shuo (born 26 July 1995) is a Chinese para table tennis player. He took a bronze medal at the 2016 Summer Paralympics in the men's C7 event. In the delayed Tokyo 2020 Summer Paralympics he improved on his previous bronze by winning gold in the same event, defeating the defending champion Will Bayley as well as taking gold in the team event for the same category, against the same opponent and his partner.

He lost most of his right leg when he was six years old, following a car accident. Like many of his teammates, Yan attended New Hope Center and trained under coach Heng Xin.
Despite his disability he is deceptively quick at moving around the table.

References

1995 births
Living people
Table tennis players at the 2016 Summer Paralympics
Table tennis players at the 2020 Summer Paralympics
Paralympic medalists in table tennis
Medalists at the 2016 Summer Paralympics
Medalists at the 2020 Summer Paralympics
Chinese male table tennis players
Paralympic gold medalists for China
Paralympic bronze medalists for China
Paralympic table tennis players of China
Para table tennis players from Pizhou
Chinese amputees